Sumptuary laws (from Latin sūmptuāriae lēgēs) are laws that try to regulate consumption. Black's Law Dictionary defines them as "Laws made for the purpose of restraining luxury or extravagance, particularly against inordinate expenditures for apparel, food, furniture, etc." Historically, they were intended to regulate and reinforce social hierarchies and morals through restrictions on clothing, food, and luxury expenditures, often depending on a person's social rank.

Societies have used sumptuary laws for a variety of purposes.  They were used to try to regulate the balance of trade by limiting the market for expensive imported goods. They made it easy to identify social rank and privilege, and as such could be used for social discrimination. They could also be used to prevent, or at least reduce opportunities for political bribery and corruption. 

The laws often prevented commoners from imitating the appearance of aristocrats, and could be used to stigmatize disfavoured groups. In Late Medieval cities, sumptuary laws were instituted as a way for the nobility to limit the conspicuous consumption of the prosperous bourgeoisie.  Bourgeois subjects appearing to be as wealthy as or wealthier than the ruling nobility could undermine the nobility's presentation of themselves as powerful, legitimate rulers. This could call into question their ability to control and defend their fief, thus inspire traitors and rebels. Such laws continued to be used for these purposes well into the 17th century.

Classical world

Ancient Greece
The first written Greek law code (Locrian code), by Zaleucus in the seventh century BC, stipulated: 

It also banned the drinking of undiluted wine except for medical purposes.

Ancient Rome
The Sumptuariae Leges of ancient Rome were various laws passed to prevent inordinate expense (Latin sūmptus) in banquets and dress, such as the use of expensive Tyrian purple dye. Roman senators and senior magistrates were entitled to wear a Tyrian purple stripe on their toga and tunic. In the early years of the Empire, men were forbidden to wear silk, which was deemed an effeminate and morally suspect material.  During the height of the Empire, expenditure on silk imported from China was so high, Imperial advisers warned that Roman silver reserves were becoming exhausted.

The Roman censors had a duty to put a check upon morals and extravagance in personal and political expenditure. The censors published details of offences in the nota censoria,  which listed the names of everyone found guilty of a luxurious mode of living; a great many instances of this kind are recorded. Towards the end of the Roman Republic, laws were passed against political corruption of Roman magistrates, forbidding their attendance at banquets given by candidates or their agents. During the period of transition from Republic to Empire, such antisumptuary laws, which may have still existed were virtually ignored by most. In the period of profligate luxury that characterized the height of the Roman Empire, the laws regarding the wearing of Tyrian purple were rigorously enforced. Infringement of this prohibition was treasonous, so punishable by death.

Roman sumptuary laws applied to both the living and the dead. Rome's most ancient laws, the laws of the Twelve Tables, forbade extravagant expenses at funerals. This included the pouring of wine over the ashes at cremations (which seems nevertheless to have been an invariable practise), the use of smoothed timbers in funeral pyres, and "excessive" mourning.

East Asia

China
Sumptuary laws existed in China in one form or another from the Qin dynasty onwards (221 BC).  The Confucian virtue of restraint was embodied in the scholarly system central to China's bureaucracy and became encoded in its laws.

Some laws concerned the size and decoration of graves and mausoleums. The founder of the Ming dynasty, the Hongwu Emperor, issued such regulations in the first year of his rule (1368) and tightened them in 1396, allowing only the highest nobility and officials of the top three ranks a  memorial stele installed on top of a stone tortoise; the steles of lower-level mandarins were perched on rectangular pedestals, while commoners had to be satisfied with a simple gravestone. The location of graves and the number of attendant statues depended on rank.

After around 1550, sumptuary law in China was reformed. It had long been ineffective. The consumption of luxuries had risen over the previous several centuries, and at the time of the European Industrial revolution, Chinese consumption of luxuries such as tea, sugar, fine silk, tobacco, and eating utensils was on a par with core regions in Europe.

Japan under the shōguns
According to Britannica Online, "In feudal Japan, sumptuary laws were passed with a frequency and minuteness of scope that had no parallel in the history of the Western world." During the Tokugawa period (1603–1868) in Japan, people of every class were subject to strict sumptuary laws, including regulation of the types of clothing that could be worn. In the second half of that period (the 18th and 19th centuries), the merchant class (chōnin) had grown far wealthier than the aristocratic samurai, and these laws sought to maintain the superiority of the samurai class despite the merchants being able to afford far more luxurious clothing and other items. The shogunate eventually gave in and allowed certain concessions, including allowing merchants of a certain prestige to wear a single sword at their belt; samurai were required to wear a matched pair when on official duty.

Islamic world

Islamic sumptuary laws are based upon teachings found in the Quran and Hadith. Males are exhorted not to wear silk clothes, nor have jewelry made of gold. Likewise, wearing clothes or robes that drag on the ground, seen as a sign of vanity and excessive pride, are also forbidden. These rules do not apply to women, who are allowed all this, but also need to cover their bodies and hair.

Prohibition of depictions of human and animal figures in general are similar to those of the Quranic prohibition on graven images. Hadiths do allow the depiction of animals on clothing items.

Medieval and Renaissance Europe

Sumptuary laws issued by secular authorities, aimed at keeping the main population dressed according to their "station", do not begin until the later 13th century. These laws were addressed to the entire social body, but the brunt of regulations was directed at women and the middle classes. Their curbing of display was ordinarily couched in religious and moralizing vocabulary, yet was affected by social and economic considerations aimed at preventing ruinous expenses among the wealthy classes and the drain of capital reserves to foreign suppliers.

Courtesans
Special forms of dress for prostitutes and courtesans were introduced in the 13th century - in Marseille, a striped cloak, in England a striped hood, and so on.  Over time, these tended to be reduced to distinctive bands of fabric attached to the arm or shoulder, or tassels on the arm.  Later restrictions specified various forms of finery that were forbidden, although there was also sometimes a recognition that finery represented working equipment (and capital) for a prostitute, and they could be exempted from laws applying to other non-noble women.  By the 15th century, no compulsory clothing seems to have been imposed on prostitutes in Florence, Venice (the European capital of courtesans), or Paris.

England
As early as the 12th century, certain articles of clothing were prohibited to crusaders and pilgrims traveling to the Holy Land under the Saladin Tithe of 1188, but scant evidence exists in the historical record of legal regulations on dress in Britain until the reign of Edward III, during which prohibitions were enacted on the import of textiles from lands outside Ireland, England, Scotland, and Wales and the exportation of domestically produced wool was likewise banned. The statute contained further restrictions on clothing based on social class; the earliest example of class-based restriction was that of fur, prohibited for anyone below the rank of lady or knight. The restriction on fur was expanded in subsequent decades in London to restrict prostitutes from wearing any furs, including budge (low-quality wool) or lambswool.

In England, which in this respect was typical of Europe, from the reign of Edward III in the Middle Ages until well into the 17th century, sumptuary laws dictated what colour and type of clothing, furs, fabrics, and trims were allowed to persons of various ranks or incomes.  In the case of clothing, this was intended, amongst other reasons, to reduce spending on foreign textiles and to ensure that people did not dress "above their station":

The first major sumptuary act was passed in the April of 1463 during the reign of Edward IV. Earlier statutes had sought to control the expense of household liveries, but the April 1463 statute marked the first attempt at a comprehensive sumptuary legislation. Scholars have interpreted the act as part of a set of protectionist economic measures that included regulations of the textile industry and trade in cloths. This statute is the first known English legislation restricting the use of "royal purple" - a term which, during the Middle Ages, referred not only to the Tyrian purple of Antiquity, but also to crimson, dark reds and royal blue. The language of the act uses technical terminology to restrict certain features of garments that are decorative in function, intended to enhance the silhouette.

A second "Act of Apparel" followed in January 1483 restricting cloth-of-gold, sable, ermine, velvet on velvet and satin brocade to knights and lords. Damask and satin were allowed for yeoman of the Crown and esquires and other members of the gentry, only if they had a yearly income of £40. Bustian, fustian, scarlet-dyed cloths and any leathers or animal hides other than lambskins were also restricted.

A 1571 Act of Parliament to stimulate domestic wool consumption and general trade decreed that on Sundays and holidays, all males over six years of age, except for the nobility and persons of degree, were to wear woolen caps on pain of a fine of three farthings (¾ penny) per day. This law instituted the flat cap as part of English wear. The 1571 act was repealed in 1597.

An extremely long list of items, specifying colour, materials, and sometimes place of manufacture (imported goods being much more tightly restricted) followed for each sex, with equally specific exceptions by rank of nobility or position held. For the most part, these laws seem to have had little effect, though the Parliament of England made repeated amendments to the laws, and several monarchs (most notably the Tudors) continually called for stricter enforcement, especially at Court "to the intent there may be a difference of estates known by their apparel after the commendable custom in times past."

The laws were justified by the reasoning that the price of certain goods increased to levels where "the treasure of the land is destroyed, to the great damage of the lords and the commonality" when "various people or various conditions wear various apparel not appropriate to their estate".

Adam Smith was against the necessity or convenience of sumptuary laws, he wrote: "of It is the highest impertinence and presumption… in kings and ministers, to pretend to watch over the economy of private people, and to restrain their expense... They are themselves always, and without any exception, the greatest spendthrifts in the society. Let them look well after their own expense, and they may safely trust private people with theirs. If their own extravagance does not ruin the state, that of their subjects never will."

Italy
During the Medieval and Renaissance eras in Italy, various towns passed sumptuary laws (leggi suntuarie) often in response to particular events or movements. For example, San Bernardino da Siena, in his public sermons in Siena, thundered against the vanity of luxurious dress; this, however, was counterbalanced by the economic benefit Siena derived as a manufacturer of items, including clothes, of luxury. One source describes these types of laws as constantly published, and generally ignored. These laws, mostly aimed at female apparel, sometimes became a source of revenue for the state: the Florentine laws of 1415 restricted the luxury that could be worn by women, but exempted those willing to pay 50 florins a year. The laws were often quite specific. Low necklines were prohibited in Genoa, Milan, and Rome in the early 16th century, and laws restricting zibellini (sable furs carried as fashion accessories) with heads and feet of precious metals and jewels were
issued in Bologna in 1545 and Milan in 1565.

France
Montaigne's brief essay "On sumptuary laws" criticized 16th-century French laws, beginning: 

He also cites Plato and Zaleucus.

Scotland

One of the earliest known Scottish sumptuary regulations was passed in 1429 during the reign of James I of Scotland. The text, written in Old Scots, preserves some medieval legal terminology related to textiles, limiting silk, some types of furs (pine martens, beech martens) and other items to men of certain social ranks like knight, lord, burgess, and their families. As with the laws of Henry V of England in 1420, silver plating was reserved for the spurs of knights and the apparel of barons or higher ranking persons. Metalsmiths caught violating these laws would be punished by death and all their lands and goods forfeit. Embroidery and pearls were also restricted. Yeomen and commoners could not wear colored clothes longer than the knee. The poke sleeve that narrowed at the wrist were allowed for sentinel yeomen who lived in their lord's house and rode with the gentlemen. Commoners' wives could not wear long-tail hoods or side-necked hoods, poked sleeves, or caps made from rich textiles like Lawn cloth or Rheims (fine linen).

Early modern era
Sumptuary laws were repealed in the early 17th century, but new protectionist laws were passed prohibiting the purchase of foreign silks and laces. Prohibitions were tied to rank and income and continued to be widely ignored.

France
In 1629 and 1633, Louis XIII of France issued edicts regulating "Superfluity of Dress" that prohibited anyone but princes and the nobility from wearing gold embroidery or caps, shirts, collars, and cuffs embroidered with metallic threads or lace, and puffs, slashes, and bunches of ribbon were severely restricted.  As with other such laws, these were widely disregarded and laxly enforced.  A series of popular engravings by Abraham Bosse depicts the supposed effects of this law.

Colonial America
 In the Massachusetts Bay Colony, a 1634 prohibition deemed that only people with a personal fortune of at least two hundred pounds could wear lace, silver or gold thread or buttons, cutwork, embroidery, hatbands, belts, ruffles, capes, and other articles.  After a few decades, the law was being widely defied. By 1651, flouting of the rules causes the leadership to issue a new strongly worded regulation to the populace again.

Modern era

While rarely do restrictions exist on the type or quality of clothing, beyond maintenance of public decency (covering parts of the body, depending upon the jurisdiction, not exhibiting unacceptable wording or images), wearing certain types of clothing is restricted to specific occupations, specifically the uniforms of organisations such as police and the military.

In some jurisdictions, clothing or other visible signs of religious or political opinion (e.g. Nazi imagery in Germany) are forbidden in certain public places.

Many American states in the 20th century prohibited the wearing of KKK hoods, masks, masquerade, or drag; gay men in New York City seized on the exemption for masquerade balls in the 1920s to 1930s to go in drag.

Proscription or requirement of native dress

Sumptuary laws have also been used to control populations by prohibiting the wearing of native dress and hairstyles, along with the proscription of other cultural customs.  Sir John Perrot, the Lord Deputy of Ireland under Queen Elizabeth I, banned the wearing of traditional woollen mantles, "open smocks" with "great sleeves", and native headdresses, requiring the people to dress in "civil garments" in the English style.

In a similar manner, the Dress Act of 1746, which formed part of the Act of Proscription issued under King George II following the Jacobite rising of 1745, made the wearing of Highland dress, including tartan and kilts, illegal in Scotland (an exemption was made for soldiers and veterans). The Act was eventually repealed in 1782, and during the Regency and Victorian eras, Highland dress gained widespread popularity, in part thanks to the visit of George IV to Scotland in 1822, which was organised by Scottish writer Sir Walter Scott.

In Bhutan, the wearing of traditional dress (which also has an ethnic connotation) in certain places, such as when visiting government offices, was made compulsory in 1989 under the driglam namzha laws. Part of the traditional dress includes the kabney, a long scarf whose coloring is regulated. Only the King of Bhutan and Chief Abbot may don the saffron scarf, with various other colors reserved for government and religious officers, and white available for common people.

Pejorative uses of term
The term "sumptuary law" has been used as a pejorative term to describe any governmental control of consumption based on moral, religious, health, or public safety, or other concerns. American Judge Thomas M. Cooley generally described their modern form as laws that "substitute the legislative judgment for that of the proprietor, regarding the manner in which he should use and employ his property." Policies to which the term has been critically applied include alcohol prohibition, drug prohibition, smoking bans, and restrictions on dog fighting.

Alcohol prohibition

As early as 1860, Anthony Trollope, writing about his experiences in Maine under the state's prohibition law, stated, "This law (prohibition), like all sumptuary laws, must fail." In 1918, William Howard Taft decried prohibition in the United States as a bad sumptuary law, stating that one of his reasons for opposing prohibition was his belief that "sumptuary laws are matters for parochial adjustment." Taft later repeated this concern. The Indiana Supreme Court also discussed alcohol prohibition as a sumptuary law in its 1855 decision Herman v. State. During state conventions on the ratification of the 21st Amendment in 1933, numerous delegates throughout the United States decried prohibition as having been an improper sumptuary law that never should have been included in the Constitution of the United States.

In 1971, a United States federal study stated that federal laws on alcohol include "sumptuary laws which are directed at the purchaser", including, "Sales are not permitted to minors or intoxicated persons. Credit is often prohibited on liquor sales, as well. Criminal penalties may be imposed for driving under the influence of alcohol, as well as for drunken behavior."

Drug prohibition

When the U.S. state of Washington considered cannabis decriminalization in two initiatives, 229 and 248, the initiatives' language stated, "Cannabis prohibition is a sumptuary law of a nature repugnant to our Constitution's framers."

See also
 Statute Concerning Diet and Apparel 1363
 Dancing ban
 Fat tax
 Frugality rules

References

Citations

Bibliography

Further reading
Brundage, James (1987). Sumptuary Laws and Prostitution in Late Medieval Italy. Amsterdam: Elsevier.
Dubos, Paul (1888). Droit romain, le luxe et les lois somptuaires: économie politique de l'influence du luxe sur la répartition des richesses. Paris: Université de France, Faculté de droit de Paris. (2014 reprint. Hachette: Paris. .)
Garlet, Tamara (2007). Le contrôle de l'apparence vestimentaire à Lausanne d'après les lois somptuaires bernoises et les registres du Consistoire de la Ville (1675–1706). University of Lausanne. www.rero.ch 
Hayward, Maria (2009). Rich Apparel: Clothing and the Law in Henry VIII's England. Farnham: Ashgate.
Killerby, Catherine (2002). Sumptuary Law in Italy: 1200–1500. New York: Oxford University Press.
Miles, Deri Pode (1987). Forbidden Pleasures: Sumptuary Laws and the Ideology of Decline in Ancient Rome. University of London Press.
Panizza, Letizia (2000). Women in Italian Renaissance Society. Oxford: European Humanities Research Centre. 
Zanda, Emanuela (2011). Fighting Hydra-Like Luxury: Sumptuary Laws in the Roman Republic. London: Bristol Classical Press.

Class discrimination
Clothing controversies
History of clothing
Legal history
Roman law
Social classes
Prohibitionism